Sunderland A.F.C. is a professional football club from Sunderland, United Kingdom. Founded in 1879 by Scottish schoolteacher James Allan, Sunderland have had eight different home grounds across Sunderland. The seventh ground, Roker Park was Sunderland's home for 99 years before being replaced by its current home, the Stadium of Light in 1997.

The early grounds in the list were little more than roped-off playing fields which were open to the public, so records regarding ground capacity and attendances are not available. But as public interest in football began to grow in the town in 1880s, the club took the opportunity to begin charging spectators an entrance fee. As such, attendance records begin to appear from Sunderland's fifth home (Abbs Field). Sunderland's sixth home at Newcastle Road could be considered the first 'proper' stadium; with outer walls, grandstands, and capacity for around 15,000 spectators, it was, at the time, regarded as the finest ground in the North East of England.

Three of Sunderland grounds have hosted full England international matches. The first at Newcastle Road in 1891, the most recent at Stadium of Light in 2016.

Grounds

References

Sunderland A.F.C.